Femmine di lusso  is a 1960 Italian romantic comedy film directed by Giorgio Bianchi and starring Ugo Tognazzi, Elke Sommer, Walter Chiari and Sylva Koscina.

It was also known as Intrigo a Taormina, Love, the Italian Way, Luxury Vacations and Travelling in Luxury.

It was released in the US in 1965 as Love, the Italian Way.

Premise
The screenplay concerns a group of passengers travelling around the Mediterranean on a luxury liner enjoying various adventures and becoming romantically involved with each other.

Cast
 Ugo Tognazzi - Ugo Lemeni
 Elke Sommer - Greta
 Walter Chiari - Walter
 Sylva Koscina - Luciana
 Gino Cervi - Ugo's father
 Caprice Chantal - Elena Le Garde
 Mario Scaccia - Edmondo, the butler
 Belinda Lee - Adriana Bessan

Production
In June 1960 it was reported the producer offered Maria Callas a role. Belinda Lee has a cameo.

References

External links

Film page at BFI
Love the Italian Way at TCMDB
Love the Italian Way at Film Affinity
Page on the film at Elke Sommer Fan Site
Film page at Letterbox DVD

1960 films
1960 romantic comedy films
1960s Italian-language films
Films set in the Mediterranean Sea
Italian romantic comedy films
1960s Italian films